Derek Hirst (born 1948, Isle of Wight) is an English historian of early modern Britain.

A Fellow of the Royal Historical Society and author of five books and over thirty articles, Hirst held a B.A. (1969) and Ph.D. (1974) from Cambridge University.  He was the William Eliot Smith Professor of History at Washington University in St. Louis, where he taught from 1975 to 2017, supervising seventeen dissertations and serving as chair of the department for several years.  His focus was on 17th-century England and his best known work is England In Conflict 1603-1660: Kingdom, Community, Commonwealth. His other academic books included Representative of the People? Voters and Voting in England under the Early Stuarts (Cambridge UP, 1975), Authority and Conflict: England 1603-1658 (Oxford UP, 1986),  and Dominion: England and its island neighbours, 1500-1707 (Oxford UP, 2012).  In addition, he published over 80 scholarly articles and reviews  (a convenient list of his most important earlier essays may be found on the Wayback Machine  ). Soon after his retirement from Washington University in St. Louis, an endowed chair of history was established in his honor at the university (2022). The chair was inaugurated by another well-published historian of early modern England, Steve Hindle. 

Hirst also worked extensively on Andrew Marvell with Steven Zwicker, a colleague at Washington University in St. Louis. Hirst and Zwicker conducted an extensive review of Marvell's work and were the first to suggest that Marvell's campaigns for the rights of the individual were the result of "an inner struggle that tugged at every fiber of his personal life." Their work has led them to be considered among the leading experts on Marvell and their findings appeared in book form in Andrew Marvell, Orphan of the Hurricane (2012).

Further reading
 "Exploring personal roots of public issues: Derek Hirst, Ph.D., probes psychology and culture to understand the course of history," March 30, 2000 Interview
 Hirst, Derek "Locating the 1650s in England's seventeenth century" History (1996) 81#263 pp 359–83 online

External links
 Derek M. Hirst, William Eliot Smith Professor of History University Communications Faculty Expert Profile
 Derek M. Hirst, William Eliot Smith Professor of History History Department Faculty Profile
 Derek Hirst CV Highlights
 Books Authored by Derek Hirst Bibliography on Amazon.com

Washington University in St. Louis faculty
Fellows of the Royal Historical Society
English historians
1948 births
Living people